Glebe House of St. Anne's Parish is a historic Episcopal glebe house located near Champlain, Essex County, Virginia. It was built about 1730, and is a two-story, three bay, brick building with a gable roof.  It measures about 50 feet long by 20 feet wide and features interior end chimneys.

It was listed on the National Register of Historic Places in 1975.

References

External links
St. Anne's Parish Glebe House, U.S. Route 17 near Route 632, Champlain, Essex County, VA: 2 photos, 5 measured drawings, and 2 data pages at Historic American Buildings Survey

Historic American Buildings Survey in Virginia
Properties of religious function on the National Register of Historic Places in Virginia
National Register of Historic Places in Essex County, Virginia
Religious buildings and structures completed in 1730
Buildings and structures in Essex County, Virginia